Francisco Benítez may refer to:

 Francisco Benítez (swimmer) (born 1962), Spanish swimmer
 Francisco Benítez (cyclist) (born 1970), Spanish road cyclist